Edward Paul Jones Liston (July 3, 1903 - August 14, 1952) was an American professional football player who played in the National Football League in 1930 for the Newark Tornadoes, appearing in one game. He died in Bradenton, Florida on August 14, 1952.

References

1903 births
1979 deaths
Players of American football from Pennsylvania
Newark Tornadoes players
Georgetown University alumni